Joseph Malish Manese (born 27 July 2002) is a South Sudanese footballer who plays as a midfielder for Kator FC and the South Sudan national team.

He played for South Sudan in the Afcon qualifier including the return game with Mali replacing Mokoi who only lasted for 36 minutes. He currently plays for the Al-Merrik football club of Sudan.

Clubs 
He currently is playing for Al-Merrik football club in Sudan. He was formerly playing for Kator FC of Juba South Sudan and left for trials in Italy after his return then sign for Al-Merrik football club of Omdurman Sudan.

References 

2002 births

Living people